The Secretary for Housing in Hong Kong is responsible for housing related issues. The position was first created in 1973 and re-created in 2022 after renamed to Secretary for Transport and Housing in 2007.

List of office holders
Political party:

Secretaries for Housing, 1973–1988

Housing issues were handled by Secretary for District Administration between 1988 and 1994.

Secretaries for Housing, 1994–1997

Secretaries for Housing, 1997–2002

Secretaries for Housing, Planning and Lands, 2002–2007

Housing issues were handled by the Secretary for Transport and Housing between 2007 and 2022.

Secretaries for Housing, 2022–

References

External links
Organisation chart of Hong Kong Government

Housing
Hong Kong